Aviador Carlos Campos Airport is an airport in Neuquén Province, Argentina serving the cities of San Martín de los Andes and Junín de los Andes. It was built in 1981. It operates daily between 12:00 and 21:00 (Local Time). In 2007, this airport handled almost 30,000 passengers.

Airlines and destinations

See also

Transport in Argentina
List of airports in Argentina

References

External links

Aeropuerto de Chapelco "Aviador Carlos Campos" at Organismo Regulador del Sistema Nacional de Aeropuertos'' (ORSNA) 
 

Airports in Neuquén Province